Barada ( / ALA-LC: Baradā) is the main river of Damascus, the capital city of Syria.

Etymology

"Barada" is thought to be derived from the word barid, which means "cold" in Semitic languages. The ancient Greek name (means "streaming with gold").

Topography and source
Throughout the arid plateau region east of Damascus, oases, streams, and a few minor rivers that empty into swamps and small lakes provide water for local irrigation. Most important of these is the Barada, a river that rises in the Anti-Lebanon Mountains and disappears into the desert. The Barada descends through a steep, narrow gorge named "Rabwe" before it arrives at Damascus, where it divides into seven branches that irrigate the Al Ghutah (الغوطة) oasis, the location of Damascus. Eventually the Ghouta reached a size of 370 square kilometers, although in the 1980s, urban growth started replacing agricultural use with housing and industry. The river has also suffered from severe drought in the last decades, mainly due to the lower rainfall rates and the large increase in the population in the area. It also suffers from serious pollution problems, especially in the summer, where there is almost no flow and little water in the basin.

Biblical mention
Barada is identified as Abana (or Amanah, in Qere and Ketiv variation in Tanakh and classical Chrysorrhoas) which is the more important of the two rivers of Damascus, Syria and was mentioned in the Book of Kings (2 Kings 5:12). As the Barada rises in the Anti-Libanus, and escapes from the mountains through a narrow gorge, its waters debouch fan-like, in canals or rivers, the name of one of which, the Banias river, retains a trace of Abana.

John MacGregor, who gives a description of them in his book Rob Roy on the Jordan, affirmed that as a work of hydraulic engineering, the system and construction of the canals, by which the Abana and Pharpar were used for irrigation, might be considered as one of the most complete and extensive in the world. In the Bible, Naaman exclaims that the Abana and Pharpar are greater than all the waters of Israel.

Branching 
Barada's water branches at Hameh village and the gorge of Rabweh into six distributaries or canals, two of which, Yazid and Tora, branch off the northern bank, while the remaining four,  Mezzawi, Derani, Qanawat, and Banias, are formed from the southern bank.

The Yazid canal runs north to the districts of Salihya and Qabun; Tora, the oldest of all, passes through Al-Jisr Al-Abyad distrct, heading to Jobar and Harasta; Mezzawi tears through Mezzeh; Derani runs towards Darya; Banias runs by the National Museum north of the Citadel and reaches Bab Touma; and, finally, the Qanawat canal pours into the southern quarters of the old city following Via Recta.

Outside the city of Damascus, the water gathers to pour into River Qleit which runs to Eastern Ghouta.

Gallery

See also
Ghouta
Water resources management in Greater Damascus

References

External links and further reading

Before Vanishing, a 2005 documentary short about the decline of Barada (French titles, no narration).

Rivers of Syria
Geography of Damascus
Hebrew Bible rivers